Schoenobius parabolistes is a moth in the family Crambidae. It is found in Brazil (Rio Grande del Sul) and Argentina.

References

Moths described in 1936
Schoenobiinae